Gueules cassées (broken faces) is a French expression for facially disfigured servicemen that originated in World War I. Colonel Yves Picot is said to have coined the term when he was refused entry to a gathering for the war-disabled.

Background 
Trench warfare protected the bodies but left the heads exposed. The introduction of the steel helmet in 1915 made head injuries more 'survivable', but this reduction of mortality meant a mutilated life for thousands.

At the start of the war those wounded to the head were generally not considered able to survive and they would not usually be 'helped first'. This changed in the course of the war, as progress was made in medical practices like oral and maxillofacial surgery and most notably in the new field of plastic surgery. Surgeons conducted experiments with bone, cartilage and tissue transplants and the likes of Hippolyte Morestin, Harold Gillies and Léon Dufourmentel made enormous advances. Because of the experimental character of this surgery some chose to remain as they were and others could just not be helped yet. Some of the latter were helped by all kinds of new prosthetics to make them look more or less 'normal', which spawned the new scientific discipline of anaplastology.

Gueules cassées 
An estimated 4.2 million French were wounded, some 300,000 of whom were classified as 'mutilated'. Of those about 15,000 can be called gueules cassées. Right after the war those facially disfigured were not considered disabled war veterans and exempt from support and veteran's benefits, but that changed later. In 1921 the Union des Blessés de la Face et de la tête (association of the wounded to the face and the head) was formed. The Colonel Picot mentioned above was one of its founders and a later president of the association. It still exists, currently under the name Gueules Cassées with slogan sourire quand même ("smiling nonetheless").

In film
 J'accuse! (1938), Abel Gance. The film features actual mutilated veterans.
 Johnny Got His Gun (1971), Dalton Trumbo
 Chariots of Fire (1981)
 The Officers' Ward (2001), François Dupeyron
 See You Up There (2017), Albert Dupontel

Music Diamanda Galás Broken Gargoyles: an oratorio for voices, strings, synthesizers, and percussion based upon the poetry of Georg Heym and Ernst Friedrich

Roger E.  Brunschwig

References

External links 
  Website of the association
 Broken gargoyles, article in The Guardian about much the same thing among Australian veterans
 "Facing the Faceless: Erased Face as a Figure of Aesthetic and Historical Experience", a scholarly article about the phenomenon of disfiguration in art and literature and in relation to "gueules cassées". See Jirsa, Tomáš. Czech and Slovak Journal of Humanities, 5 (1), 2015, 104-119.

French casualties of World War I
France in World War I
Military terminology
French words and phrases
Mutilation
Ugliness